Veronicastrum is a genus of flowering plants in the family Plantaginaceae. In some taxonomy systems, Veronicastrum species have been placed within the genus Veronica. The most commonly cultivated species is Veronicastrum virginicum, which is native to the Eastern parts of North America. Veronicastrum has previously been part of the family Scrophulariaceae.  However, following recent genetic studies, several genera were transferred to other families including Veronicastrum, transferred to Plantaginaceae.

Species of genus Veronicastrum 
 Veronicastrum borissovae
 Veronicastrum cerasifolium
 Veronicastrum sachalinense
 Veronicastrum sibiricum, Sibirian veronicastrum 
 Veronicastrum tubiflorum
 Veronicastrum virginicum, Culver's root, eastern North America.

References

Notes

Bibliography

 

Plantaginaceae
Plantaginaceae genera